Scarteen is a townland in the civil parish of Ballyscaddan, County Limerick, near the village of Knocklong. It is best known for the Scarteen Hunt, a fox hunting pack of Kerry Beagles based at Scarteen House, a big house owned since the 1750s by the Ryan family, one of the few Catholic gentry of Penal times. The dogs' coat pattern gave the hunt its nickname, the "Black and Tans", later applied derisively to the Royal Irish Constabulary Special Reserve during the Irish War of Independence. Hunt master Thady Ryan (1923–2005) increased the hunt's cachet among visitors from Great Britain and the United States and, later, Continental Europe. Ryan was chef d'equipe of the Irish eventing team at the 1964 and 1968 Olympics.  the hunt was mastered by Thady Ryan's son Chris Ryan.

References

Townlands of County Limerick
Fox hunting
Hunting in Ireland